The 2010 Winmau World Masters was the fourth major tournament on the BDO/WDF calendar for 2010. It took place from 29 to 31 October in the Hull City Hall, which hosted the event for the first time, taking over from the Bridlington Spa Royal Hall. It was broadcast by the BBC. Martin Adams, who was the defending champion and top seed, successfully defended the tournament by beating Stuart Kellett 7–3 in the final.

Seeds

Men
  Martin Adams
  Stuart Kellett
  Steve West
  Dean Winstanley
  Tony O'Shea
  Garry Thompson
  Ross Montgomery
  Scott Waites

Women
  Deta Hedman
  Trina Gulliver
  Irina Armstrong
  Karen Lawman
  Julie Gore
  Dee Bateman
  Tricia Wright
  Karin Krappen

Men's Draw

Ladies Draw

References

World Masters (darts)
World Masters
Sport in Kingston upon Hull
2010s in Kingston upon Hull